I Married an Angel is a 1942 American musical film based on the 1938 musical comedy of the same name by Rodgers and Hart. The film was directed by W. S. Van Dyke and starred Jeanette MacDonald and Nelson Eddy, who were then a popular onscreen couple. Supporting cast members included Edward Everett Horton, Binnie Barnes, Reginald Owen, Douglass Dumbrille, Mona Maris, and Odette Myrtil.

Cast
 Jeanette MacDonald as Anna / Brigitta
 Nelson Eddy as Count Palaffi
 Edward Everett Horton as Peter
 Binnie Barnes as Peggy
 Reginald Owen as 'Whiskers'
 Douglass Dumbrille as Baron Szigethy
 Mona Maris as Marika
 Janis Carter as Sufi
 Inez Cooper as Iren
 Leonid Kinskey as Zinski
 Anne Jeffreys as Polly
 Marion Rosamond as Dolly
 Odette Myrtil as The Modiste (uncredited)

Music
It featured several additional songs not written by Rodgers and Hart. Romantic composer Eva Dell'Acqua's song "Villanelle" for coloratura soprano appeared on the soundtrack of the film.

 "But What of Truth?" (written for the 1942 film with music by Herbert Stothart and lyrics by George Forrest and Robert Wright)
 "Hey Butcher" (written for the 1942 film with music by Herbert Stothart and lyrics by George Forrest and Robert Wright)
 "May I Present the Girl" (written for the 1942 film with music by Herbert Stothart and lyrics by George Forrest and Robert Wright)
 "There Comes a Time" (written for the 1942 film with music by Herbert Stothart and lyrics by George Forrest and Robert Wright)
 "Tira Lira La" (written for the 1942 film with music by Richard Rodgers and lyrics by George Forrest and Robert Wright)
 "To Count Palaffi" (written for the 1942 film with music by Herbert Stothart and lyrics by George Forrest  and Robert Wright)

Reception
According to MGM records, the film earned $664,000 at the United States and Canadian box office and $572,000 elsewhere, costing the studio a loss of $725,000 - the studio's least successful film of 1942. It was the last of the MacDonald-Eddy films.

See also
 List of films about angels

References

External links

 
 
 
 

1942 films
1942 musical comedy films
American musical comedy films
American musical fantasy films
American romantic musical films
American black-and-white films
Films about angels
Films based on musicals
Films directed by W. S. Van Dyke 
Films scored by Herbert Stothart
Metro-Goldwyn-Mayer films
1940s romantic musical films
1940s English-language films
1940s American films